Zodarion elegans is a spider species found in Southern Europe and North Africa.

See also 
 List of Zodariidae species

References

External links 

elegans
Spiders of Europe
Spiders of Africa
Spiders described in 1873